Nizhneangarsk (Doodo Angar; , Door Angar) is an urban locality (an urban-type settlement) and the administrative center of Severo-Baykalsky District of the Republic of Buryatia, Russia, located at the northern tip of Lake Baikal,  north of Severobaykalsk. As of the 2010 Census, its population was 5,030.

History
It was founded in 1643 by the Russian explorer Semyon Skorokhod and was originally called Verkhneangarsk, after the fort built here by Vasily Kolesnik in 1646. In the 1970s, it was planned to make Nizhneangarsk the headquarters of the western end of the Baikal–Amur Mainline, but the marshy ground made it hard to build large buildings, so the headquarters were moved south to Severobaykalsk.

Administrative and municipal status
Within the framework of administrative divisions, Nizhneangarsk serves as the administrative center of Severo-Baykalsky District. As an administrative division, the urban-type settlement (inhabited locality) of Nizhneangarsk, together with one rural locality (the settlement of Davsha), is incorporated within Severo-Baykalsky District as Nizhneangarsk Urban-Type Settlement (an administrative division of the district). As a municipal division, Nizhneangarsk Urban-Type Settlement is incorporated within Severo-Baykalsky Municipal District as Nizhneangarsk Urban Settlement.

Transportation
Nizhneangarsk is the location of the Nizhneangarsk Airport, with flights to Ulan-Ude and Irkutsk, however, since Bural ceased operations, no flights are made during the winter.
The town is also served by the Baikal–Amur Mainline that connects Nizhneangarsk with Severobaikalsk and Tayshet by railway. Train 076Э connects the town with Moscow and runs every two days.

Demographics
In the last decade, Nizhneangarsk has had a decrease in its population: 5,019 (2011), 4,963 (2012), 4,885 (2013), 4,822 (2014), 4,781 (2015), 4,710 (2016) and 4,520 (2017).

Climate
Nizhneangarsk has a subarctic climate (Köppen climate classification Dfc), with severely cold winters and mild summers. Precipitation is moderate and is significantly higher in summer than at other times of the year.

References

Notes

Sources

Urban-type settlements in Buryatia
Populated places in Severo-Baykalsky District
Populated places established in 1643
1643 establishments in Russia
Populated places on Lake Baikal